Haydn Quartet may refer to:

 String quartets by Joseph Haydn
 The Haydn Quartets written by Wolfgang Amadeus Mozart and dedicated to Haydn

or

The Haydn Quartet, American close-harmony vocal group